This is the discography of the South Korean singer Psy. He is well known for his humorous videos and stage performances, and for his hit single "Gangnam Style", a song about where he came from and which talks about the life of the people of Gangnam, which is a neighborhood in Seoul, South Korea. and his follow-up single "Gentleman".

In January 2001, Psy debuted with his full-length album Psy from the Psycho World!, for which he received a fine due to accusations that the album contained "inappropriate content". He released his controversial second album, Sa 2, in 2002, which sparked complaints from concerned civil groups due to the potentially negative influence his album would have on children and teenagers. Since then, Psy has been thought of as a controversial artist, and Sa 2 was banned in 2002 from being sold to those under the age of 19. Later in September the same year, Psy released his third album 3 Mai. The album's title song, "Champion", saw great success partly due to the hype from the World Cup games held in Seoul. Despite the significant amount of controversy surrounding his music, Psy was awarded with songwriting accolades at the annually held Seoul Music Awards, which marked his breakthrough in the music industry of South Korea.

In 2006, Psy released his 4th album Sa Jib, which won honors at the 2006 SBS Music Awards and the Mnet Asian Music Awards. Psy released his 5th album PsyYFive in 2010, but its lead single "Right Now" was banned by South Korea's Ministry of Gender Equality and Family for its "obscene" lyrics. Despite his lead single being banned, Psy received awards during the 2011 Melon Music Awards and Mnet Asian Music Awards. Prior to the release of "Gangnam Style", Psy had topped domestic music charts half a dozen times throughout his 12-year career, according to Billboard.

In July 2012, PSY released his 6th album Psy 6 (Six Rules), Part 1 and the song "Gangnam Style" appeared in broadcasting networks and newspapers outside Asia. On August 14, "Gangnam Style" ranked first on YouTube's 'Most Viewed Videos' monthly chart; it has received over 2 billion on YouTube (the first to reach this mark and currently is one of the most viewed videos in YouTube's history). His single, "Gentleman", was released on April 12, 2013 in 119 countries.

Albums

Studio albums

Extended plays

Remix album

Singles

As lead artist

As featured artist

Other charted songs

Music videos

As lead artist

Notes

References

External links
 Official website
 Official Me2Day Page
 

Discographies of South Korean artists
Discography
Hip hop discographies